A disc protrusion is a medical condition that can occur in some vertebrates, including humans, in which the outermost layers of the anulus fibrosus of the intervertebral discs of the spine are intact but bulge when one or more of the discs are under pressure.

Many disk abnormalities seen on MRI that are loosely referred to as "herniation" are actually just incidental findings. These may be unrelated to any symptoms and are just bulges of the anulus fibrosus. Jensen and colleagues, in an MRI study of the lumbar spine in 98 asymptomatic adults, found that in more than half, there was a symmetrical extension of a disc (or discs) beyond the margins of the interspace (bulging). In 27 percent, there was a focal or asymmetrical extension of the disc beyond the margin of the interspace (protrusion), and in only 1 percent was there more extreme extension of the disc (extrusion or sequestration). These findings emphasize the importance of using precise terms in describing the imaging abnormalities and evaluating them strictly in the context of the patient's symptoms.

A disc protrusion may progress to a spinal disc herniation, a condition in which there is a tear in the anulus fibrosus.

References

Bones of the vertebral column